Gilbert High School (GHS) is the oldest public high school in Gilbert, Arizona, United States and is part of Gilbert Public Schools. It opened in 1918 and celebrated its 100th graduating class in 2017. The school enrolled 2,051 students in 2018-19, grades 9–12, and operates on a traditional school calendar. Gilbert's colors are Black and Gold and the teams are collectively called the Tigers.

In 2017, Gilbert High School earned the A+ School of Excellence™ Award from the Arizona Educational Foundation. The school is a member of the Arizona Interscholastic Association's 5A San Tan Athletics Conference and competes in Division I and II sports.

History

On June 19, 1917, an election was held "for the purpose of establishing and maintaining a high school" in the recently formed Gilbert School District #41.
Gilbert High School's first building opened in 1917. The first graduating class, consisting of 4 graduates, was in 1918.

In the 1960s, Gilbert relocated to a new site where present day Mesquite Junior High School now stands. In 1987, the school moved to its current location. Gilbert High School's original site is now the district administration building. In 2017, Gilbert High celebrated its 100th graduating class, consisting of 600 students.

Demographics
As of 2018-19, there were 102 total teachers, principals, and other school leaders and 2,051 students currently enrolled at the school with enrollment listed at 100%. Of the 102 teachers, principals, and other school leaders, 85 (83.33%) are listed as having greater than 3 years experience in the field and 7 (6.86%) of 102 are listed as teaching out of the subject area in which they are certified.

The racial makeup of the students, in 2018-19, was 3.31% African American, 3.56% Asian, 28.77% Hispanic, 1.66% Native American, 0.88% Pacific Islander, and 59.09% White. The four-year graduation rate within the first 4 years of enrolling in high school was 88.89%. Graduation rates were broken down to: 85.28% Male, 92.36% Female, 80% African American, 86.36% Asian, 86.47% Hispanic, N/A% Native American, 90.7% White, 81.82% Multiple Races, 81.9% Low SES, and 76.19% Special Education. In 2015-2016, reports indicate 414 students were enrolled in at least one advanced placement course, 515 students with chronic absenteeism, 31 indents of violence and 2 students reported as harassed or bullied based on sex, race, color, national origin or disability.

Academics
Gilbert High School is said to offer "over 220 courses in 14 departments" including: Accelerated Learning, Advanced Placement and Honors Curriculum, Comprehensive Core Curriculum, School-to-Work, Community College Dual Credit Courses, ELL, On-Site Special Education, and Vocational Career /Technological Education Programs.

In 2017, Gilbert High School earned the A+ School of Excellence™ Award from the Arizona Educational Foundation. The award program is said to be "a comprehensive school assessment program that celebrates outstanding schools and brings to light the positive stories and successes happening in public schools every day".

In the fiscal year 2019, the Arizona Department of Education published an annual achievement profile for Gilbert High School resulting in a grade of "B" based on an A through F scale. Scores were based on "year to year student academic growth, proficiency on English language arts, math and science, the proficiency and academic growth of English language learners, indicators that an elementary student is ready for success in high school and that high school students are ready to succeed in a career or higher education and high school graduation rates".

In 2020, the United States national nonprofit organization, GreatSchools, gives Gilbert High School a 5/10 (down from 7/10 in 2019) overall rating noting that students perform "average on state tests, have above average college readiness measures, and are making average year-over-year academic improvement. This school is said to have below average results in how well it’s serving disadvantaged and low income students. The organization gives Gilbert High School academic scores of 7/10 (down from 8/10 in 2019) for "college readiness", 5/10 (down from 7/10 in 2019) for standardized "test scores", and 5/10 (down from 6/10 in 2019) for "Academic progress". The school was also given equity scores of 2/10 (down from 5/10 in 2019) for "equity overview" (disadvantaged students are falling behind) and 3/10 for "low income students" (low-income kids are being left behind).

Extracurricular activities

Athletics

Gilbert High School is one of six high schools in the Arizona 5A San Tan Athletics Conference. In 2017, the boys soccer team won the 2017 Arizona championship and finished 6th in the nation. In 2019, the boys Basketball Varsity team won the 2018-19 5A State of Arizona Championship at Desert Financial Arena. and finished with a 29-1 record.

State championships for the Tigers in sports include the following:

Boys' baseball: 1966, 1977, 1980, 1984, 1985, 1987, and 1991
Boys' basketball: 1962, 1985, 2003, and 2019
Girls' basketball: 1984, 1986, 1991, and 1992
Girls' cross country: 1992
Boys' cross country: 2020
Boys' football: 1973, 1975, 1978, and 1985
Girls' golf: 1996
Boys' soccer: 2004 and 2017
Boys' track and field: 1927, 1960, 1961, 1962, 1971, 1972, 1983, 1984, and 1985
Girls' track and field: 1983 and 1990
Boys' volleyball: 2012
Girls' volleyball: 1972, 1995, 2003, 2006, and 2011
Boys' wrestling: 1985 and 1993

Band
Gilbert Band finished first in the 2018 Band State Championship Division 5. The band program is one of the top programs in the state, having their marching band, the Gilbert Tiger Pride, finish top 10 the past 6 years in Arizona and fourth place during the 2016 season. Other programs include the Gilbert Indoor Percussion and the Gilbert Black Guard. These programs both finished 2nd in Arizona during the 2017 season. During the 2018 season, both guard and drumline made it to finals for the western regional competition in California and placed 1st in the state of Arizona at WGAZ championships. The indoor percussion received first place in Arizona recently in 2014 and 2016, along with a 4th-place finish at the WGI World Championships in 2014.

Clubs and Activities

Gilbert High School Air Force Junior ROTC AZ-941 placed first in the JROTC Desert Classic Drill Competition State Championship in 2019.

 Air Force Junior ROTC AZ-941
 Art Club
 Asian Culture Club
 AVID
 Band
 Baseball 
 Basketball (Boys)
 Choir Club
 Clay Club
 Community Service Club
 Cross Country (Boys/Girls)
 Culinary Club/ Hero FCCLA
 Culture Club
 Dance
 FCCLA - TOYBOX
 Fashion Club
 Future Educators/Educators Rising
 Future Farmers of America (FFA) Club
 Gay Straight Alliance (GSA)
 Golf (Boys)
 Golf (Girls)
 Goon Squad
 HERO FCCLA
 Japan club
 Jokerfish
 Marching Band
 Math Club
 Metals-Jewelry Club
 National History Honor Society
 National Honor Society
 Orchestra 
 Photo Club
 Psychology Club
 Science National Honor Society
 Skills USA
 Soccer (Boys)
 Speech and Debate
 Sports Medicine Club
 Student Council
 Tennis (Boys)
 Tennis (Girls)
 Gilbert Theater Ensemble
 Tiger Buddies
 Tiger Crew
 Tiger Town
 Tigers For Our Lives
 Track 	
 Yearbook Club 	
 Young Democratic Socialists of America (YDSA)
 Youth Training Program (YTP)

Awards

 In 2017, Gilbert High School earned the A+ School of Excellence™ Award from the Arizona Educational Foundation. As of spring 2019, thirteen Gilbert Public Schools have earned the award.
 In 2018, the Gilbert Tiger was awarded "Best Mascot" and the campus preschool was awarded "Best Preschool Program" in the Best of Gilbert 2018 issue of the East Valley Tribune.

Notable alumni
 Haley Cavinder, social media personality and college basketball player
 Alan Gordon, soccer player
 D. J. Peterson, baseball player
 Dustin Peterson, baseball player
 Dennis Sarfate, baseball player
 Stephen Tarpley, baseball pitcher
 Ryan Toolson, basketball player
 Rick Woolstenhulme Jr., drummer

In popular media 
Student Navey Baker was featured in the October 4, 2013 episode of NPR show This American Life for her role as the Gilbert High Tiger mascot. She was also featured on the second season of the Hulu original documentary series, Behind the Mask.

Gilbert High School senior Samantha LaMay made the transformation from lacrosse-playing tomboy to stylish girly girl on the season premiere of MTV’s "Made" in 2005.

References

External links 

 High School website
 Gilbert Band Program

Education in Gilbert, Arizona
Educational institutions established in 1918
Public high schools in Arizona
Schools in Maricopa County, Arizona
1917 establishments in Arizona